Marion Township is the name of some places in the U.S. state of Pennsylvania:

Marion Township, Beaver County, Pennsylvania
Marion Township, Berks County, Pennsylvania
Marion Township, Butler County, Pennsylvania
Marion Township, Centre County, Pennsylvania

Pennsylvania township disambiguation pages